SCATS as an acronym may refer to:

Sydney Coordinated Adaptive Traffic System, an urban traffic control system
Southern Counties Agricultural Trading Society, an agricultural supplies and services company
Study Centre for the Advancement of Technology and Social Welfare, a Sri Lankan voluntary organisation
StapleCross Amateur Theatrical Society, a drama group

Scats may also refer to:
Scatophagidae, a family of fish

See also
Scat (disambiguation)